This is a list of bridges in Sri Lanka.

References

Sri Lanka
Bridges
Bridges